Diana Elizabeth Edelman Kleiner (born September 18, 1947 in New York City) is an American art historian and educator. A scholar of Ancient Roman art and architecture, Kleiner is the Dunham Professor of the History of Art Emeritus at Yale University.

Career
Born in New York City to Morton Henry and Hilda Rachel Wyner Edelman, Kleiner received a Bachelor of Arts from Smith College in 1969. She then continued on to Columbia University to earn degrees in Art History: a Master of Arts in 1970, a Master of Philosophy in 1974, and Doctor of Philosophy in 1977. Kleiner wrote a doctoral dissertation on Roman funerary art.

Kleiner began her teaching career as a lecturer in art history at the University of Virginia in 1975. A year later, she was named Assistant Professor of Art History at Harvard University. In 1980, Kleiner was hired by Yale University, and was promoted to Associate Professor two years later. In 1989, she became the Dunham Professor of the History of Art, a position held until retirement, when she was named Emeritus. Additionally, from 1995 to 2003, Kleiner was the Deputy Provost for the Arts from 1995 to 2003.

In 1972, Kleiner married to fellow art historian Fred Scott Kleiner, Professor of Art History and Archeology Emeritus at Boston University. The couple met at Columbia and have one child: Alexander In 2020, the Kleiners had a room at the American School of Classical Studies at Athens named in their honor.

Select works
 Roman Imperial Funerary Altars with Portraits, 1987 
 Cleopatra and Rome, 2005 
 Roman Architecture: A Visual Guide, 2014

References

External links
 Yale University profile

1947 births
Living people
Educators from New York City
Women art historians
Smith College alumni
Columbia University alumni
University of Virginia faculty
Harvard University faculty
Yale University faculty